Cathy Simon is an American architect. She is known for her adaptive reuse and urban design projects, many of which are in the Bay area. She is currently a Design Principal at Perkins and Will. She was one of five founding partners of the influential female-owned firm SMWM (Simon Martin-Vegue Winkelstein Moris), based in San Francisco. She and Martin-Vengue have spent more than 18 years "building one of the nation's largest women-owned firms." She has worked on major projects including the conversion of the San Francisco Ferry building, the San Francisco Main Library, the renovation of PG&E's San Francisco headquarters, and the San Francisco Conservatory of Music.

Significant projects 
 Conservations and restoration of the San Francisco Ferry Building (SMWM)
 San Francisco Conservatory of Music (SMWM)
 San Francisco Main Library (SMWM and Pei Cobb Freed & Partners)
 Hearst Memorial Gym at University of California Berkeley (SMWM)
 Oceanside Water Pollution Control Plant (SMWM)
 The Metreon, an entertainment and shopping complex in San Francisco at Yerba Buena Gardens (SMWM and Handel Architects)
 Master plans for Stanford, Harvard, Brown, and NYU (SMWM)
 Heinz and Lilo Bertelsmann Campus Center, Bard College, Annandale-on-Hudson, New York (SMWM)
 Franklin W. Olin Humanities Building, Bard College, Annandale-on-Hudson, New York (SMWM and Wank Adams Slavin)
 Marin Academy Performing Art Center and Field House, San Rafael, California (SMWM)
 140 New Montgomery (Perkins + Will)
 Primate Discovery Center, San Francisco Zoo (Marquis Associates)

Awards 
 American Institute of Steel Construction Award of Excellence of the Primate Discovery Center, 1985
 Excellence in Design Award / Restoration & Rehabilitation for the San Francisco Ferry Building, American Institute of Architect's San Francisco Design Awards, 2004
 EDRA/Places Award for Design for the San Francisco Ferry Building, 2007

Education 
Simon is a graduate of Wellesley College and Harvard University's Graduate School of Design.

References

Living people
American women architects
Wellesley College alumni
Harvard Graduate School of Design alumni
Year of birth missing (living people)
21st-century American women